O or Oh is a family name in Korea. It is written using the hanja characters, 吳, 五, 伍, 吾, and 晤. According to the 2015 census in South Korea, there were 763,281 people carrying the O surname.

History
The earliest ancestor of the Korean Oh family is believed to be Oh Eung from Silla, the son of Oh Cheom known to be the Chinese royal descendant who migrated from China to Korea and married the daughter of Kim Jong-ji in Silla.
 
16 clans have historically emerged under the family name Oh. The largest five clans, in order, are Haeju, Dongbok, Boseong, Hamyang, and Gunwi Oh clans. Out of these clans, the three largest clans were founded by the three brothers of Oh Hyeon-bo, Oh Hyeon-jwa, and Oh Hyun-pil, who each was given the governor position of Haeju, Dongbok, and Boseong counties as the rewards for defending Goryeo against the attack by the Khitan people.

Each of the five biggest clans traces its founder back to:
 Haeju Oh Clan: Oh Heyon-bo, the governor of Haeju County during the era of Goryeo
 Dongbok Oh Clan: Oh Hyeon-jwa, the governor of Dongbok County during the era of Goryeo
 Boseong Oh Clan: Oh Hyun-pil, the governor of Boseong County during the era of Goryeo  
 Hamyang Oh Clan: Oh Gwang-hwi, the official during the era of Goryeo  
 Gunwi Oh Clan: Oh Suk-gwi, the second son of Oh Hyeon-jwa who later became the governor of Gunwi county during the era of Goryeo

Global distribution
In 2000, the people with the surname Oh in the United States was estimated to be 2,477 people. Most Koreans in the US prefer the surname Oh rather than O as a single letter name can often be misunderstood as an abbreviation or misprinting.

List of people with the surname 
 Cédric O, French politician, Secretary of State for Digital Affairs
 Delphine O, French politician, member of the National Assembly for Paris's 16th constituency 
 David Oh, Korean American politician
 Felicia Oh, American black belt in Brazilian jiu-jitsu and submission grappling competitor
 Hee Oh, South Korean mathematician
 Sandra Oh, Canadian-American actress
 Oh Bong-Jin, South Korean footballer
 Oh Dae-gyu, South Korean actor 
 Oh Dae-hwan, South Korean actor
 Oh Dae-keun, South Korean field hockey player
 Oh Dal-su, South Korean actor
 Oh Eun-seok, South Korean sabre fencer 
 Oh Eun-sun, South Korean mountaineer
 Oh Eun-young, South Korean TV Host, model and beauty pageant titleholder
 Oh Ha-young, South Korean actress and singer, member of girl group Apink
 Oh Hyeon-gyu, South Korean footballer
 Oh Hyuk, South Korean singer, member of indie rock band Hyukoh 
 Raina (born Oh Hye-rin), South Korean singer, member of girl group After School
 Oh In-kyun, South Korean footballer
 Oh Jae-il, South Korean baseball player
 Oh Jae-moo, South Korean actor 
 Oh Jae-suk, South Korean footballer 
 Oh Jae-seong, South Korean volleyball player 
 Oh Jae-won, South Korean baseball player
 Oh Jang-eun, South Korean footballer 
 Oh Ji-eun, South Korean actress
 Oh Ji-ho, South Korean actor and model
 Oh Ji-hwan, South Korean baseball player 
 J-Min (born Oh Ji-Min) South Korean singer
 Oh Ji-young (golfer), South Korean professional golfer
 Oh Ji-young, South Korean professional volleyball player 
 Oh Jin-hyek, South Korean archer
 O Jin-u (1917-1995), North Korean marshal and Politburo member
 Oh Jong-hyuk, South Korean singer and actor 
 Oh Joo-ho, South Korean footballer
 Oh Ju-hyun, South Korean football midfielder
 Oh Ju-won, South Korean baseball pitcher 
 Oh Joo-yeon, South Korean voice actress
 Oh Joon, South Korean ambassador to the United Nations
 Junggeun Oh, South Korean artist
 O Jung-hup (1910–1939), North Korean military officer
 Oh Jung-se, South Korean actor 
 Oh Man-seok, South Korean actor 
 Oh Min-keun, South Korean former boxer 
 Oh Min-suk, South Korean actor
 Oh Sang-uk, South Korean fencer
 Oh Sangwon, South Korean author
 Oh Se-hoon, South Korean politician 
 Oh Se-hun, South Korean rapper and actor, member of boy group Exo
 Oh Seung-bum, South Korean football midfielder
 Oh Seung-hoon, South Korean footballer
 Oh Seung-hoon (actor), South Korean actor and model
 Seung-hwan Oh, South Korean baseball pitcher
 Oh Seung-lip, South Korean judo practitioner
 Oh Seung-shin, South Korean field hockey player
 Oh Seung-soon, South Korean fencer
 Oh Seung-yoon, South Korean actor
 Oh Seong-ok, South Korean handball player
 Oh Taeseok, South Korean playwright and director
 Oh Takbeon, South Korean poet, author and critic
 Oh Yeon-ah, South Korean actress
 Oh Yeon-ho, South Korean journalist 
 Oh Yun-kyo (1960–2000), South Korean footballer
 Oh Yeon-seo, South Korean actress
 Oh Young-ki, South Korean handball player 
 O Yoon (1946–1986), South Korean painter
 Oh Yoon-ah, South Korean actress
 Oh Youn-hyung, South Korean rugby union player 
 Oh Yoon-kyung, North Korean former football defender
 Oh Yon-kyung, South Korean former volleyball player 
 Oh Yun-suk, South Korean handball player
 Oh Yong-ran, South Korean handball player
 O Yeong-su (writer) (1909-1979), South Korean novelist
 O Yeong-su (actor), South Korean actor
 Oh Uhtaek, South Korean physiologist

See also
List of Korean surnames
 O family (North Korea), an influential family within the North Korean regime
 Ou (surname), for Chinese surnames sometimes rendered Ao, Au, O, or Oh
 Wang (surname), an East Asian surname rendered as Ō in Japanese

References

Korean-language surnames